Sharifi-ha House is a modular home in Tehran, Iran. It was built in 2013 and has three wooden boxes which are rooms; the boxes can be rotated laterally. The resulting 90 degree rotation extends the living space and creates a large terrace.

Background 
The home was designed by Alireza Taghaboni from Next Office. The unique design was created because there was only a narrow lot to work with, which measured . The façade faces South and it is the only part of the house which can get natural light. It is located in the Darrous neighborhood and was designed to accommodate climate and lifestyle. The home was named Sharifi-ha which means "Sharif's family" in Persian.

The home was created with three wood clad rotating boxes which can be positioned to take advantage of the natural light. In the winter months the boxes can remain closed and in the summer they can be rotated independently and extended  out of the façade.

There are two basement floors with a fitness area, and above that floor there is a section for a housekeeper. The next four floors are living areas of the home. The home also has a  pool and a sauna.

Design 
There are three rotating boxes which are steel frames clad with planks of wood. Each box has French doors which are at right angles so that each box can be accessed when the façade is closed or opened. The boxes can be rotated 90 degrees, and it takes 20 seconds to rotate each box using an electric turntable. The turntables were designed by the German company Bumat using a system similar to those found in car exhibitions.

When in the open position a terrace is created because the boxes are rectangles with a single pivot point. When the box rotates a guard rail which is folded extends to provide a railing for the terrace. Many Iranians use outdoor space during the summer months.

Reception 
CNN's Matthew Ponsford and Layla Maghribi compared the home to a Rubik's Cube and they called it the Transformer House. The home won several awards: Grand Memar Award 2014 1st Prize Residential and the Middle East Award (MEA) 2014 1st Prize Residential.

See also
Nakagin Capsule Tower

References

External links 
Video: Amazing House In Tehran Whose Rooms Rotate 90°
Video: Sharifiha house_Iran Rotating House

Houses completed in 2013
Houses in Iran
Buildings and structures in Tehran
Architecture in Iran